St. Michael of Lillo is a Roman Catholic church  built on the Naranco mount, near the Church of Santa María del Naranco in Asturias. It was completed in 842 and it was consecrated by Ramiro I of Asturias and his wife Paterna in the year 848. It was originally dedicated to St. Mary until this worship passed to the nearby palace in the 12th century, leaving this church dedicated to Saint Michael. It has been a UNESCO World Heritage Site since 1985.

 It originally had a basilica ground plan, three aisles with a barrel vault, although part of the original structure has disappeared as the building collapsed during the 12th or 13th century. Nowadays, it conserves its western half from that period, together with several elements in the rest of the church such as the fantastic jambs in the vestibule or the extraordinary lattice on the window of the southern wall, sculpted from one single piece of stone.

Gallery

See also
 Asturian architecture
 Catholic Church in Spain
 Rose window

References

External links
 
 NOTICIAS de la parroquia - Parroquia Sta Maria Naranco

9th-century churches in Spain
World Heritage Sites in Spain
Miguel de Lillo
Buildings and structures in Oviedo
Pre-Romanesque architecture in Asturias
9th-century establishments in Spain
Bien de Interés Cultural landmarks in Asturias
Religious buildings and structures completed in 848